Liberales is an independent liberal think tank (some tend to call Liberales left-liberal), located in Ghent, Flanders, Belgium. The organization promotes progressive liberalism and supports individual freedom, justice, a certain degree of self-government and human rights. It also supports responsibility, civil liberties, and solidarity. Liberales opposes conservatism, fascism, communism, libertarianism, and religious intolerance.

Andreas Tirez is the spokesman of the organization. Other well-known members of the board are Mathias De Clercq, a liberal Member of the Belgian Chamber of Representatives and Ghent alderman, and Dirk Verhofstadt, the brother of the former liberal Belgian Prime Minister Guy Verhofstadt.

Liberales is recognized as an influential liberal think tank in Flanders, but has no structural link with the Flemish liberal party VLD.

Oxford Manifesto

On 17 December 2007, at De Markten in Brussels, Liberales presented a new version of the Oxford Manifesto.

See also
 Contributions to liberal theory
 Green liberalism
 Liberaal Vlaams Verbond (LVV)
 Liberal International
 Liberalism in Belgium
 Nova Civitas
 Oxford Manifesto
 Karl Popper
 John Rawls
 Social liberalism

External links

Liberales' Mission Statement

Think tanks based in Belgium
Political and economic think tanks based in the European Union